M. G. Gupta, known as Bekas Akbarabadi (1925-2011), was an Indian Urdu poet and research scholar. He wrote several books including Indian mysticism, Sikh Gurus, Saint Kabir, Hindu epics and others. He received the Bharat Jyoti Award for his contribution in the field of education and research.

Early life
Gupta was born on 29 August 1925 in Kairana, Uttar Pradesh, India. He pursued his Masters of Arts in Political Science. He served as a professor at the Allahabad University where he taught for twenty years, he was a scholar of Persian literature, comparative religion and mysticism. He was awarded the degree of Doctor of Letters by the Allahabad University in 1965. He also served as a registrar of Agra University. He died on 12 December 2011 in Agra.

Works
In 1985 he wrote a book called Bekas Akbarabadi. In 1992 he wrote a book called Indian mysticism. He also wrote books on the Sikh Gurus, Saint Kabir and on the Hindu epics, the Ramayana and the Mahabharata. In July 1993, he was awarded the Bharat Jyoti Award for his 'contribution in the field of education and research'. A collection of his poems entitled, Rahat-i-Ruh was published in 2004.

Sarmad the Saint
Gupta wrote and published his celebrated work Sarmad the Saint: Life and Works in 1991. According to A. G. Noorani, Indian Express, 21 June 1992 (New Delhi) "… the first definitive study of Sarmad's life, and an English translation of original Persian text of all the 341 quatrains by Dr. MG Gupta. He has also translated the legendary Rumi's classic work, the Mathnawi. Dr. Gupta's scholarship is evident … (He) traces Sarmad's life with a wealth of authentic references …"

References

External links
 Books by M. G. Gupta

1925 births
2011 deaths
Urdu-language poets from India
20th-century Indian poets
Indian male poets
Poets from Uttar Pradesh
20th-century Indian male writers
People from Agra